Paranoid & Sunburnt is the debut studio album by British rock band Skunk Anansie, first released in 1995 via One Little Indian Records. It was re-released in 2005 with a DVD featuring the videos to the singles. This album was recorded with the band's original drummer, Robbie France, but he is not featured on the cover. The album, featuring a mix of controversial protest songs (mainly about politics and religion), peaked at number 8 in the UK Albums Chart.

Track listing

Singles
Five singles were taken from Paranoid & Sunburnt, four of which were commercially released.

Personnel
Technical
Andy Wallace – mixing
Donald Christie – photography

Charts

Weekly charts

Year-end charts

Certifications

References

External links
[ Listen to samples of all tracks from Paranoid & Sunburnt at AllMusic] - Requires Windows Media Player

1995 debut albums
Skunk Anansie albums
One Little Independent Records albums